The National Westminster Bank, Castle Street, Liverpool, England is a Grade II* listed building.

A typical 19th-century bank building of early renaissance style with closely spaced classically styled windows and a heavily moulded cornice.

It was built between 1898 and 1901 for Parr's Bank, having been designed by Richard Norman Shaw. It later housed NatWest Bank, until they closed the bank in October 2017, putting it out for rent. Plans were announced in October 2021 to convert the venue into a 92-bed hotel and bar. Liverpool City Council approved planning permission for the ground floor to be turned into a bar and restaurant in July 2022, with further permission on turning the upper floors into a hotel with roof extension pending.

See also
 Architecture of Liverpool

References

External links
 Liverpool architecture

Grade II* listed buildings in Liverpool
NatWest Group